Air Support is a 1992 game for the Amiga and Atari ST. It is a top-down strategy game, with a first-person mode available for special missions. The game takes place during a retro-futuristic 21st century where all wars are fought in virtual reality.

Reception

Reviews
Amiga Action
Power Play
Amiga Joker
Amiga Format
Amiga Power
ST Format
Joystick (French)

References

External links
Air Support at Atari Mania
Air Support at Lemon Amiga

1992 video games
Amiga games
Atari ST games
Psygnosis games
Strategy video games
Video games set in the 21st century
Video games developed in the United Kingdom